Nathaniel Langdon Frothingham (23 July 1793 – 3 April 1870) was an American Unitarian minister and pastor of the First Church of Boston from 1815 to 1850. Frothingham was opposed to Theodore Parker and the interjection of transcendentalism into the church. He also wrote sermons, hymns, and poetry.

Early life
Nathaniel Langdon Frothingham was born on July 23, 1793, in Boston, Massachusetts the son of Ebenezer Frothingham and Joanna Langdon. He attended Boston Latin School under the charge of Samuel Hunt. He graduated from Harvard College in 1811 at the age of eighteen and gave a commencement speech entitled "The Cultivation of the Taste and Imagination," which was described by Dr. Pierce as "written with purity and pronounced with elegance."

Career

In 1812, Frothingham became the first Instructor of Rhetoric and Oratory at Harvard.

On March 15, 1815, Frothingham became an ordained Minister of the First Church in Boston. He remained there until March 1850.

Frothingham had been five years in the pulpit when the Unitarian controversy broke out. The American Unitarian Association was formed in 1825. In March 1835, the twentieth anniversary of his settlement in the First Church, he preached:

The dependence was on miracle. Frothingham said, in a sermon on the "Manifestation of Christ": 

In a sermon entitled "The Ruffian Released", preached in 1836, he said: 

He disagreed with the philosophy of Les Misérables, Victor Hugo's famous novel, which seemed to imply that a change of outward conditions would effect a change of character, that the social arrangement was radically wrong, and that the "paralysis of the person" was contingent on "the narrowness of the lot", which ran counter to his beliefs.

The following is from Parker's journal:

Frothingham was elected a Fellow of the American Academy of Arts and Sciences in 1856. He corresponded with Ralph Waldo Emerson, and was a thorough student of the German language when such scholarship was rare in America.

Family
In 1818, Frothingham married Ann Gorham Brooks, daughter of Peter Chardon Brooks and sister of the wives of Edward Everett and Charles Francis Adams, Sr.

They had three children, all born in Boston. Octavius Brooks Frothingham was born November 26, 1822, and became an author. Ward Brooks Frothingham was born November 16, 1828, and resided for a time in Burlington, serving in two town offices. Ellen Frothingham was born March 25, 1835 and became a translator (German into English).

Ann Frothingham died on July 4, 1864, in Burlington, Massachusetts.

Illness
In the summer of 1826, Frothingham was afflicted by weekly violent headaches.

In 1859, on a third foreign tour of eighteen months, in Europe with his wife and daughters, Frothingham first became aware of a defect in his vision. He could not enjoy picture-galleries, and saw distorted figures and blurred colors. He consulted oculists in Paris and London, but no disease was visible in his eyes. When he returned home in the autumn of 1860, the dimness had increased.

In 1865, he underwent an unsuccessful operation on his eyes and became totally blind. His disease was of the nature of glaucoma and was incurable.

Work

Sermons
Deism Or Christianity? Four Discourses, Kessinger Publishing, LLC, (1845) reprint (March 4, 2009),  
Two Hundred Years Ago: A Sermon Preached to the First Church, on the Close of Their Second Century, 1830, Printed for the Society 
God with the Aged: A Sermon Preached to the First Church, Jan. 7, 1849, J. Wilson, 1849.
Christian Patriotism: A Sermon, on the Occasion of the Death of John Adams, Munroe and Francis, 1826.
 Sermons in the Order of a Twelvemonth, 1852.

Hymns
 "60R O You Whose Presence Glows In All", Hymns of the Spirits Three

Poetry
In the introduction to a translation of the first of the Elegies of Propertius, a writer in the Augustan Age of Roman poetry, Frothingham says: 

 Xenia epigram
 "The Crossed Swords", Edmund Clarence Stedman, ed. An American Anthology, 1787–1900, 1900
 
 "Sartor Resartus", Christian Examiner for September, 1836, N. L. Frothingham.

References

External links

Frothingham, N.L. (Nathaniel Langdon) (1793–1870), Harper's Magazine

Harvard College alumni
1793 births
1870 deaths
19th-century Unitarian clergy
Fellows of the American Academy of Arts and Sciences
American religious writers
People from Burlington, Massachusetts